Godfrey James (16 April 1931 – 29 October 2019) was an English actor.

His film appearances include: Séance on a Wet Afternoon (1964), Witchfinder General (1968), The Oblong Box (1969), Cry of the Banshee (1970), The Blood on Satan's Claw (1970), Villain (1971), Hide and Seek (1972), The Land That Time Forgot (1974), At the Earth's Core (1976), Camille (1984), Out of Order (1987) and Piccolo Grande Amore (1993).

In the 1970's British police drama The Sweeney, episode Big Spender, James appeared as hard man Charley Smith, part of an organized crime family who involve themselves with two dishonest employees of a car park company in an elaborate fraud.

His television credits include: The Avengers, Dixon of Dock Green, Department S, Z-Cars, UFO (the 1970 episode "The Square Triangle"), The Onedin Line, Space: 1999, The Lotus Eaters, The Carnforth Practice, Special Branch, The Sweeney, Doctor Who (the serial Underworld), Return of the Saint, The Aphrodite Inheritance, The Standard, Minder, The Professionals, Bergerac, The Dark Side of the Sun, The Bill, Dempsey and Makepeace, Emmerdale Farm, Coronation Street, A Very Peculiar Practice and Crime Traveller. He died in Eastbourne in October 2019 at the age of 88.

Partial filmography
The Amorous Prawn (1962) - Sergeant at Exchange
Séance on a Wet Afternoon (1964) - Mrs. Clayton's Chauffeur
Witchfinder General (1968) - Webb
The Oblong Box (1969) - Weller
Cry of the Banshee (1970) - Head Villager
Vertige pour un tueur (1970) - (uncredited)
The Private Life of Sherlock Holmes (1970) - Second Carter
The Blood on Satan's Claw (1971) - Mr. Blake - Angel's Father (uncredited)
Villain (1971) - Car Lot Manager
Hide and Seek (1972) - Police Constable Dickie
The Land That Time Forgot (1974) - Borg
The Hostages (1975)
At the Earth's Core (1976) - Ghak
Arabian Adventure (1979) - Jailer (voice)
Camille (1984, TV movie) - Gautier
Out of Order (1987) - Desk Sergeant
Piccolo grande amore (1993) - Franz
Leapin' Leprechauns! (1995) - King Kevin
Magic in the Mirror (1996) - Melilot
Spellbreaker: Secret of the Leprechauns (1996) - King Kevin
In the Shadow of the Sandcastle (1996) - Robin
Magic in the Mirror: Fowl Play (1996) - Meliloto
This actor has died at the age of 88 and on another page it says he is 90

References

External links
 

1931 births
2019 deaths
English male film actors
English male stage actors
English male television actors
Male actors from London